The following elections occurred in the year 1893.

 1893 Liberian general election
 1893 Newfoundland general election

North America

Canada
 1893 Edmonton municipal election
 1893 Newfoundland general election
 1893 Prince Edward Island general election

United States
 1893 New York state election
 United States Senate election in New York, 1893

Europe
 1893 French legislative election
 1893 German federal election

Oceania

Australia
 1893 South Australian colonial election

New Zealand
 1893 New Zealand general election
 1893 City of Auckland by-election
 1893 Inangahua by-election
 1893 Thames by-election
 1893 Wanganui by-election

See also
 :Category:1893 elections

1893
Elections